British big beat duo The Chemical Brothers have released nine studio albums, one live album, five compilation albums, two remix albums, five mix albums, one soundtrack album, two video albums, six extended plays, thirty-five singles, fifteen promotional singles and thirty-two music videos.

Albums

Studio albums

Compilation albums

Remix albums

Mix albums

Soundtrack albums

Video albums

Extended plays

Singles

Promotional singles

Music videos

Remixes

Notes
A  Further was deemed ineligible to chart on the UK Albums Chart due to all copies of Further giving buyers the chance to win an iPad; chart regulations forbid merchandise or prizes being used as enticements to buy releases.
B  "Block Rockin' Beats" did not enter the Billboard Hot 100, but peaked at number 7 on the Bubbling Under Hot 100 Singles chart, which acts as a 25-song extension to the Hot 100.
C  "Elektrobank" did not enter the Billboard Hot 100, but peaked at number 22 on the Bubbling Under Hot 100 Singles chart, which acts as a 25-song extension to the Hot 100.

References

External links
 Official website
 
 
 

Discography
Chemical Brothers, The
Electronic music discographies